Bahaar is a 1988 Indian Hindi-language film directed by Suraj Prakash, starring Raj Kiran and Rupini .

Cast

Raj Kiran
Rupini

Music
" Baahon Mein Aasmaan Le Chala" - Asha Bhosle
"Humsafar Ban Ke Humdum" - Alka Yagnik, Suresh Wadkar
"Main Paani Mein Bheegi Aise" - Asha Bhosle
"Tumko Jabse Kareeb Dekha Hai" - Alka Yagnik, Bhupinder Singh
"Zulfon Ka Andhera Hai" - Penaz Masani

References

External links
 

1988 films
1980s Hindi-language films
Films scored by Manoj–Gyan